Iran competed at the 2017 World Aquatics Championships in Budapest, Hungary from 14 July to 30 July.

Swimming

Iran has received a Universality invitation from FINA to send one male swimmer to the World Championships.

References

Nations at the 2017 World Aquatics Championships
Iran at the World Aquatics Championships
2017 in Iranian sport